Taeniophyllum norfolkianum, commonly known as the Norfolk Island ribbonroot, is a species of small, leafless epiphytic orchid. It has short stems, cylindrical green roots pressed against the substrate on which it is growing and between two and five small, tube-shaped, yellowish green flowers opening one at a time. It occurs on Norfolk Island but has also been reported from the North Island of New Zealand.

Description
The flowers open one at a time. Flowering occurs from August to September.

Taxonomy and naming
Taeniophyllum norfolkianum was first formally described in 2006 by David Jones, Bruce Gray and Mark Clements and the description was published in The Orchadian from a specimen collected on Mount Bates. The specific epithet (norfolkianum) refers to Norfolk Island. The ending -ianum is derived from the Latin suffix -anus meaning "pertaining to" or "belonging to".

Distribution and habitat
The Norfolk Island ribbonroot grows on the leafy branches of Norfolk Island pine (Araucaria heterophylla) but it has also been seen growing on gorse (Ulex europaeus) on the North Island of New Zealand.

References

norfolkianum
Endemic orchids of Australia
Flora of Norfolk Island
Orchids of New Zealand
Plants described in 2006